Anglo-Saxon England is an annual peer-reviewed interdisciplinary academic journal covering the study of various aspects of history, language, and culture in Anglo-Saxon England. It has been published since 1972 by Cambridge University Press and is available in print and digital form. The first forty volumes of the journal included a bibliography porividng an overview of the past year's work in Anglo-Saxon studies; a cumulative bibliography is now available online, published by Cambridge University Press.

The journal's motto, 'here one can still see their track', is drawn from King Alfred's Old English translation of Cura pastoralis. Every edition of the journal has, as its front cover, an image of the obverse of Alfred’s ‘London Monogram’ penny.

Its current editors are Simon Keynes, Rosalind Love and Rory Naismith (all based at the University of Cambridge). Previous editors include Malcolm Godden, Peter A. Clemoes and Michael Lapidge.

See also
Old English Newsletter

References

External links
 

English history journals
Publications established in 1972
Annual journals
Cambridge University Press academic journals
English-language journals
1972 establishments in England
Anglo-Saxon reference works